Tomasz Gudzowaty (born 1971) is a Polish documentary filmmaker, portrait and art photographer, who gained international recognition through numerous publications and awards, most notably – in World Press Photo in which he succeeded nine times. He is also a multiple winner or finalist of such competitions as: Pictures of the Year International, NPPA's Best of Photojournalism, International Photography Awards, B&W Spider Awards, and National Portrait Gallery's Taylor Wessing Photographic Portrait Prize.

He traveled to over 100 countries on all continents for his photographic projects, pursuing diverse subjects, with special focus on wildlife, sport, and social issues. In recent years, portraiture has become essential in his photography. Apart from magazine publications, his works appeared in several books, and were presented at individual exhibitions at museums and galleries worldwide. According to one survey, Tomasz Gudzowaty is the best known name in contemporary Polish photography.

In recognition of his achievements, Gudzowaty received high honors from the state and national organizations in Poland, including the Knight's Cross of the Order of Polonia Restituta, awarded by the President of Poland in 2000, the Award in Visual Arts from the Polish Society of Authors and Composers ZAIKS in 2012, and the Gold Olympic Laurel in Photography from the Polish Olympic Committee in 2013.
He is the son of businessman and philanthropist Aleksander Gudzowaty. He is married to Melody Gudzowaty, who excelled in many beauty pageants  - Miss Islas Baleares 2008 (winner), Reina Hispanoamericana 2009 (second runner up), Miss Dominican Republic International 2012 (winner), Miss International 2012 (third runner up) – and currently is working with him on a major art project named “Planets Alive”.

Early life
Gudzowaty was born on September 19, 1971 in Warsaw, Poland. According to his statements in several interviews, he got interested in photography from early childhood owing to his maternal uncle, a serious amateur photographer and self-appointed chronicler of his home town. Despite that, Gudzowaty initially wanted to become a lawyer, earning a master's degree from the Faculty of Law and Administration of the University of Warsaw. Soon after, however, he returned to his true vocation, switching to photography full-time.

Career
In the 1990s Gudzowaty won several awards at the Polish Press Photography Contest (Krajowy Konkurs Fotografii Prasowej), and traveled extensively in Africa and Asia. His international breakthrough came in 1999 when he was awarded the First Prize in Nature-singles category in the World Press Photo competition for a picture of young cheetahs just before killing their first prey. The photograph, titled First lesson of killing, has become iconic and eventually found their way even to schoolbooks and postal stamps. Gudzowaty confirmed his position in nature photography by winning another two prizes in the same World Press Photo category in 2000. At that time he was among very few photographers from Eastern Europe to win this highly prized competition. His black and white images of African wildlife were widely published in the Polish and international press, such as Max magazine (German edition), and the prestigious Cartier Art magazine. They were also shown in Nikon Photo Gallery in Zurich, Switzerland, and in a traveling exhibition to Polish cities.  Later, after a few years break, he returned to nature photography in 2008 with a project on the Antarctic emperor penguins, titled “The Colony”.

Gudzowaty was accredited as a photojournalist at the Summer Paralympic Games in 2000 in Sydney and in 2004 in Athens. In 2003 he was again among the winners at the World Press Photo with a photo story about Gongfu monks of Shaolin Temple in China, which marked his switch to sport photography for the next decade. Most of his further achievements in press photography exhibitions (World Press Photo, Pictures of the Year, Best of Photojournalism, Polish Grand Press Photo) were in sport-related categories. He focused on ethnic and other non-mainstream sports, continually developing a long term project under the name “Sports Features”, later changed to “Beyond the Body”. The project resulted in various magazine publications (among others: L’Equipe, Newsweek, Forbes, Time, Photo, GQ, The Guardian, National Geographic Traveler, British Journal of Photography, Red Bull magazine), and also in exhibitions shown in galleries around the world, such as Maison de Photographie in Lille, France, Bulger Gallery in Toronto, Canada, Kontrast Gallery in Stockholm, Sweden, Ethnographic Museum in Budapest, Hungary, Gallery Speak For in Tokyo, Japan, to name a few.

During that period, he also undertook several photojournalism projects documenting social and environmental issues, the most known of them being a photo story on workers in the ship-breaking yards in Chittagong, Bangladesh. The pictures from that series, completed in the years 2004-2005, were presented and published in different contexts, e.g. in the catalogue for exhibition “Ingenuity – Photography and Engineering 1845-2005” held by Calouste Gulbenkian Foundation in Lisbon and Bruxelles, an exhibition during the Festival de la Mer in Vannes, France, and four images have been quoted by Pierre Borhan in his book The Sea: An Anthology of Maritime Photography since 1843. There was also an album Shipwreckers, awarded at the Pictures of the Year for the best book publication in 2005. In 2012, Hatje Cantz published a book containing completely re-edited material under the title Keiko. That edition was recognized by the German Book Foundation as one of the most beautiful German books of the year 2013. Among his books published by Steidl, Closer received positive reviews in New Yorker and The New York Times.

In 2009 Gudzowaty's photographs were shown at Rencontres d'Arles festival as part of the joint exhibition “Ça me touche” curated by Nan Goldin.

Gudzowaty's next projects confirmed his reputation in sport photography, which has evolved from his photojournalism roots towards a creative, artistic expression. In this style, he covered such projects as retired Olympic champions, Mexican free wrestling (lucha libre) and illegal car races in Mexico, parkour, urban golf in Mumbai slums, pole dancing in Sydney, naghol ritual in Vanuatu, etc. Known mainly for his black and white nature and sport photos, he is also an accomplished art and fashion photographer. His latest project of that kind, named “Planets Alive” and featuring a Dominican-Spanish model Melody Mir Jimenez, was announced to public in 2014.

Tomasz Gudzowaty is a member of several professional organizations, such as the International Sports Press Association (AIPS), and  the Union of Polish Art Photographers (ZPAF).

In 2018, he was awarded a Doctor of Arts in Film, Photography & Media from Krzysztof Kieślowski Film School of University of Silesia in Katowice, Poland.

Style
Gudzowaty's style was described as very individual and highly elaborated aesthetically, prompting questions about the limits of classic photography and the new creative possibilities of the medium. Most of his projects have been done in black and white, in the form of photo essays consisting usually of twelve images. As a sport photographer, he couples his interest in the metaphysics of sport with social awareness. Among the artists who influenced him most, he frequently names Sebastião Salgado.

In 2007 Gudzowaty started to use a large format camera (Linhof Master Technika) for his projects, almost completely abandoning 35mm SLR. The change had a direct impact on his style, favoring even more elaborated composition and playing with a shallow depth of focus. He has also tended to include more portraits in his subsequent projects. Portraiture has become a strong strand in his art, a fact that has been reflected in his newer achievements in such competitions as The Taylor Wessing Photographic Portrait Prize awarded by the National Gallery London, or Spider Black And White Photo Awards.

Books

 'Following wild trails'. Warszawa : Yours Photography, 2004. 
 'Of eagle and man'. Warszawa : Yours Photography. 
 'Paradise crossing', Warszawa : Yours Photography, 2004. 
 'Wide wild world', Warszawa : Yours Photography, 2004. 
 'Shipwreckers', Warszawa : Yours Photography, 2005
 'Keiko', Ostfildern : Hatje Cantz, 2012. 
 'Beyond The Body. Tomasz Gudzowaty in the eyes of Nan Goldin'. Göttingen : Steidl Verlag 2015. 
 'Closer'. Göttingen : Steidl Verlag 2016. 
 'Proof'. Göttingen : Steidl Verlag 2016. 
 'Photography as a New Kind of Love Poem'. Göttingen : Steidl Verlag 2016.

Awards

2014
 
 Black & White Spider Awards – Photographer of the Year, USA
 Black & White Spider Awards - 1st Place - Outstanding Achievement, People category, USA
 Black & White Spider Awards - Honorable Mention, People category, USA
 Black & White Spider Awards - 1st Place - Outstanding Achievement, Sport category, USA
 Black & White Spider Awards - 2nd Place, Sport category, USA
 Black & White Spider Awards - 1st Place - Outstanding Achievement, Photojournalism category, USA
 Black & White Spider Awards - Honorable Mention, Photojournalism category, USA
 Black & White Spider Awards – two Honorable Mentions, Portrait, USA IPA – 3rd Place, Editorial: Sports, USA
 IPA – Honorable Mention, Deeper Perspective, USA
 IPA – two Honorable Mentions, Photo Essay and Feature Story, USA
 IPA – two Honorable Mentions, Sports, USA
 IPA – two Honorable Mentions, Children, USA
 IPA – two Honorable Mentions, Portrait, USA
 IPA – Honorable Mention, Culture, USA
 IPA – Honorable Mention, Family, USA
 Pictures of the Year International - Third prize, Recreational Sports, USA
 NPPA Best of Photojournalism -1st Place, Portrait series, USA 
 Grand Press Photo 2014 - Second prize, Sports - stories category, Poland
 Grand Press Photo 2014 - Second prize, Environment - stories category, Poland
 
2013
 
 Black & White Spider Awards - Honorable Mention, Photojournalism category, USA
 Black & White Spider Awards – two Honorable Mentions, Sport category, USA
 Black & White Spider Awards – 3rd Place – Honor of Distinction, Wildlife category, USA
 IPA – Honorable Mention, Sports, USA
 IPA – Honorable Mention, Portrait, USA
 IPA – Honorable Mention, Family, USA
 
2012
 
 Black & White Spider Awards - 1st Place - Outstanding Achievement, People category, USA
 Black & White Spider Awards - Honorable Mention, Sport category, USA
 NPPA Best of Photojournalism - Honorable Mention, Sports Picture Stories category, USA 
 Grand Press Photo 2012 - First prize, Sports - stories category, Poland
 Grand Press Photo 2012 - Second prize, Sports - stories category, Poland
 Grand Press Photo 2012 - First prize, Sports - singles category, Poland
 Grand Press Photo 2012 - Third prize, Sports - singles category, Poland
 The PGB Photo Award - First prize, Sports Feature Picture of the Year category, Sweden
 Pictures of the Year International - First prize, Recreational Sports, USA
 Pictures of the Year International - Second prize, Sports Picture Story, USA
 World Press Photo - Third prize, Sport - stories category, Holland 
 
2011
 
 NPPA Best of Photojournalism - First prize, Sports Feature category, USA 
 Grand Press Photo 2011 - First prize, Sports - stories category, Poland
 Grand Press Photo 2011 - Second prize, Sports - stories category, Poland
 Pictures of the Year International - First prize, Sports Picture Story category, USA
 Pictures of the Year International - Second prize, Sports Features, USA
 World Press Photo - Second prize, Sport - stories category, Holland 
 
2010
 
 Pictures of the Year International - Third prize, Sports Picture Story category, USA
 The PGB Photo Award - First prize, Sports Picture Story of the Year category, Sweden
 
2009
 
 Grand Press Photo 2009 - First prize, Sports - stories category, Poland
 Grand Press Photo 2009 - Second prize, Sports - singles category, Poland
 NPPA Best of Photojournalism - First prize, Sport Picture Story category, USA
 NPPA Best of Photojournalism - First prize, Portrait Series category, USA
 NPPA Best of Photojournalism -  Second prize, Portrait Series category, USA
 Pictures of the Year International - First prize, General Division / Sports Action category, USA
 World Press Photo - Third prize, Sport Features - singles category, Holland 
 
2008
 
 Grand Press Photo 2008 - Grand Prix, Picture of the Year, Poland
 Grand Press Photo 2008 - First prize, Sports - stories category, Poland
 Grand Press Photo 2008 - First prize, Sports - singles category, Poland
 Grand Press Photo 2008 - Second prize, Sports - singles category, Poland
 NPPA Best of Photojournalism - Honorable Mention, Sport Picture Story category, USA
 NPPA Best of Photojournalism - First prize, Sports Enterprise category, USA
 Pictures of the Year International - First prize, General Division / Sports Portfolio category, USA
 World Press Photo - Third prize, Sport Features - singles category, Holland 
 
2007
 
 Pictures of the Year International - Award of Excellence, General Division / Sports Feature category, USA
 Pictures of the Year International - Award of Excellence, General Division / Sports Picture Story category, USA
 Grand Press Photo 2007 - Second prize, Sports - singles category, Poland
 Grand Press Photo 2007 - Second prize, Sports - stories category, Poland
 
2006
 
 The Humanity Photo Awards - Documentary Prize, Education, Recreation, Sports & Technology category, China
 The Humanity Photo Awards - Documentary Prize, Daily Life category, China
 NPPA Best of Photojournalism - Honorable Mention, Best Published Picture Story category, USA
 NPPA Best of Photojournalism - Honorable Mention, Sport Picture Story category, USA
 Grand Press Photo 2006 - Third prize, Daily Life category, Poland
 World Press Photo - Third prize, Sport Feature - stories category, Holland
 
2005
 
 Pictures of the Year International - Award of Excellence, Magazine Division / Feature Picture Story category, USA 
 
2003
 
 World Press Photo - First prize, Sport - singles category, Holland 
 World Press Photo - Second prize, Sport - stories category, Holland
 Polish Press Photography competition (KPFP) - III prize, The World We Live In category, Poland
 
2001
 
 Polish Press Photography competition (KPFP) - II prize, kategoria: Sport - singles category, Poland
 Polish Press Photography competition (KPFP) - II prize, kategoria: Sport - stories, Poland
  
2000
 
 World Press Photo - Second prize, Nature and Environment - singles category, Holland 
 Polish Press Photography competition (KPFP) - I prize, The World We Live In category, Poland
 Polish Press Photography competition (KPFP) - II prize, The World We Live In category, Poland
 Polish Press Photography competition (KPFP) - III prize, The World We Live In category, Poland
  
1999
 
 World Press Photo - First prize, Nature and Environment - singles category, Holland
 Polish Press Photography competition (KPFP) - II prize, The World We Live In category, Poland

Personal life
On August 23, 2014, Gudzowaty married Melody Mir Jimenez, a Dominican-Spanish photo model and beauty pageant queen. The couple has two daughters: Audrey, born July 23, 2015, and Alaia Bella, born October 25, 2016.

Varia
 Gudzowaty's photography was cited in a novel Le Port-Plume de Corbu by French author Daniel Braud.
 A story of his friendship with his real-life pet dog named Najki inspired a novel by Margaret Mahy “Tale of a Tail”.

References

1971 births
Photographers from Warsaw
Living people